Lesya can mean:

 Lesya, Russian and Ukrainian feminine name that is a variant of Alexandra
 Lesya Ukrainka (1871–1913), Ukrainian poet, writer and critic. Named after her:
 The Lesya Ukrainka National Academic Theater of Russian Drama is a theater in Kyiv, Ukraine
 Asteroid 2616 Lesya.
 Lesya Vasil'yevna Dychko (1939–), Ukrainian composer
 Lesya Vorotnyk, Ukrainian ballerina
 Lesya Yaroslavskaya (1981–), Russian pop singer
 Lesya, the coloring of the soul in Jainism